Hunter College is a public university in New York City. It is one of the constituent colleges of the City University of New York and offers studies in more than one hundred undergraduate and postgraduate fields across five schools. It also administers Hunter College High School and Hunter College Elementary School.

Hunter was founded in 1870 as a women's college; it first admitted male freshmen in 1946. The main campus has been located on Park Avenue since 1873. In 1943, Eleanor Roosevelt dedicated Franklin Delano Roosevelt's and her former townhouse to the college; the building was reopened in 2010 as the Roosevelt House Public Policy Institute at Hunter College. The institution has an 57% undergraduate graduation rate within six years.

History

Founding

Hunter College has its origins in the 19th-century movement for normal school training which swept across the United States. Hunter descends from the Female Normal and High School, established in New York City in 1870. It was founded by Thomas Hunter, an exile from Ireland because of his nationalist beliefs. Hunter was president of the school during the first 37 years. It was originally a women's college for training teachers. The school, which was housed in an armory and saddle store at Broadway and East Fourth Street in Manhattan, was open to all qualified women, irrespective of race, religion or ethnic background. At the time most women's colleges had racial or ethno-religious admissions criteria.

Created by the New York State Legislature, Hunter was deemed the only approved institution for those seeking to teach in New York City. The school incorporated an elementary and high school for gifted children, where students practiced teaching. In 1887, a kindergarten was established as well. (Today, the elementary school and the high school still exist at a different location, and are now called the Hunter College Campus Schools.)

During Thomas Hunter's tenure as president of the school, Hunter became known for its impartiality regarding race, religion, ethnicity, financial or political favoritism; its pursuit of higher education for women; its high entry requirements; and its rigorous academics. The first female professor at the school, Helen Gray Cone, was elected to the position in 1899. The college's student population quickly expanded, and the college subsequently moved uptown, in 1873, into a new red brick Gothic structure facing Park Avenue between 68th and 69th Streets. It was one of several public institutions built at the time on a Lenox Hill lot that had been set aside by the city for a park, before the creation of Central Park.

In 1888 the school was incorporated as a college, taking on the name Normal College of the City of New York, under the statutes of New York State, with the power to confer the degree of A.B. This led to the separation of the school into two "camps": the "Normals", who pursued a four-year course of study to become licensed teachers, and the "Academics", who sought non-teaching professions and the Bachelor of Arts degree. After 1902 when the "Normal" course of study was abolished, the "Academic" course became standard across the student body.

Expansion
In 1913 the east end of the building, housing the elementary school, was replaced by Thomas Hunter Hall, a new limestone Tudor building facing Lexington Avenue and designed by C. B. J. Snyder. The following year the Normal College became Hunter College in honor of its first president. At the same time, the college was experiencing a period of great expansion as increasing student enrollments necessitated more space. The college reacted by establishing branches in the boroughs of Brooklyn, Queens, and Staten Island. By 1920, Hunter College had the largest enrollment of women of any municipally financed college in the United States. In 1930, Hunter's Brooklyn campus merged with City College's Brooklyn campus, and the two were spun off to form Brooklyn College.

In 1936 fire destroyed the 1873 Gothic building facing Park Avenue, and by 1940 the Public Works Administration replaced it with the Modernist north building, designed by Shreve, Lamb & Harmon along with Harrison & Fouilhoux.

The late 1930s saw the construction of Hunter College in the Bronx (later known as the Bronx Campus). During the Second World War, Hunter leased the Bronx Campus buildings to the United States Navy who used the facilities to train 95,000 women volunteers for military service as WAVES and SPARS. When the Navy vacated the campus, the site was briefly occupied by the nascent United Nations, which held its first Security Council sessions at the Bronx Campus in 1946, giving the school an international profile.

In 1943, Eleanor Roosevelt dedicated a town house at 47–49 East 65th Street in Manhattan to the college. The house had been a home for the future President and First Lady. Today it is known as The Roosevelt House of Public Policy and opened in fall 2010 as an academic center hosting prominent speakers.

CUNY era

Hunter became the women's college of the municipal system, and in the 1950s, when City College became coeducational, Hunter started admitting men to its Bronx campus. In 1964, the Manhattan campus began admitting men also. The Bronx campus subsequently became Lehman College in 1968.

In 1968–1969, Black and Puerto Rican students struggled to get a department that would teach about their history and experience. These and supportive students and faculty expressed this demand through building take-overs, rallies, etc. In Spring 1969, Hunter College established Black and Puerto Rican Studies (now called Africana/Puerto Rican and Latino Studies). An "open admissions" policy initiated in 1970 by the City University of New York opened the school's doors to historically underrepresented groups by guaranteeing a college education to any and all who graduated from NYC high schools. Many African Americans, Asian Americans, Latinos, Puerto Ricans, and students from the developing world made their presence felt at Hunter, and even after the end of "open admissions" still comprise a large part of the school's student body. As a result of this increase in enrollment, Hunter opened new buildings on Lexington Avenue during the early 1980s. In further advancing Puerto Rican studies, Hunter became home to the Centro de Estudios Puertorriqueños ("Center for Puerto Rican Studies" or simply "Centro") in 1982.

Today, Hunter College is a comprehensive teaching and research institution. Of the more than 20,000 students enrolled at Hunter, nearly 5,000 are enrolled in a graduate program, the most popular of which are education and social work. Although less than 28% of students are the first in their families to attend college, the institution maintains its tradition of concern for women's education, with nearly three out of four students being female. In 2006, Hunter became home to the Bella Abzug Leadership Institute, which has training programs for young women to build their leadership, public speaking, business and advocacy skills.

In recent years, the institution has integrated its undergraduate and graduate programs to successfully make advanced programs in fields such as (Psychology and Biology) – "PhD Program", (Education) – "Master's Program", (Mathematics) – "Master's Program", -"PhD Program" (Biology & Chemistry) – "Biochemistry", (Accounting) – "Master's Program" along with the highly competitive (Economics) – "Master's Program" to which only a select few students may enter based on excellent scholarship and performance, and less than half will earn a master's degree by maintaining a nearly perfect academic record and performing thesis research.

Although far from the polar regions, Hunter is a member institution of the University of the Arctic, a network of schools providing education accessible to northern students.

Campuses

Main campus

Hunter College is anchored by its main campus at East 68th Street and Lexington Avenue, a modern complex of three towers – the East, West, and North Buildings – and Thomas Hunter Hall, all interconnected by skywalks. The institution's official street address is 695 Park Avenue, New York, NY 10065. (Formerly bearing the ZIP code of 10021, the code changed on July 1, 2007, in accordance with the United States Postal Service's plan to split the 10021 ZIP code.) The address is based on the North Building, which stretches from 68th to 69th Streets along Park Avenue.

The main campus is situated two blocks east of Central Park, near many of New York's most prestigious cultural institutions including the Metropolitan Museum of Art, the Asia Society Museum, and the Frick Collection. The New York City Subway's 68th Street–Hunter College station on the IRT Lexington Avenue Line is directly underneath, and serves the entire campus. Adjacent to the staircase to the station, in front of the West Building, sat an iconic Hunter sculpture, "Tau", created by late Hunter professor and respected artist Tony Smith. The sculpture has been removed as of October 2018 due to restoration purposes.

The main campus is home to the School of Arts and Sciences and the School of Education. It features numerous facilities that serve not only Hunter, but the surrounding community, and is well known as a center for the arts. The Assembly Hall, which seats more than 2,000, is a major performance site; the Sylvia and Danny Kaye Playhouse, a 675-seat proscenium theatre, has over 100,000 visitors annually and hosts over 200 performances each season; the Ida K. Lang Recital Hall is a fully equipped concert space with 148 seats; the Frederick Loewe Theatre, a 50 x  black box performance space is the site of most department performances; and the Bertha and Karl Leubsdorf Art Gallery hosts professionally organized art exhibits.

Students have access to specialized learning facilities at the main campus, including the Dolciani Mathematics Learning Center, the Leona and Marcy Chanin Language Center, and the Physical Sciences Learning Center. Hunter has numerous research laboratories in the natural and biomedical sciences. These labs accommodate post-docs, PhD students from the CUNY Graduate School, and undergraduate researchers.

College sports and recreational programs are served by the Hunter Sportsplex, located below the West Building.

Satellite campuses
Hunter has two satellite campuses: The Silberman School of Social Work Building, located on third Avenue between East 118th and East 119th Streets, which houses the School of Social Work, the School of Urban Public Health, and the Brookdale Center on Aging; and the Brookdale Campus, located at East 25th Street and first Avenue, which houses the Hunter-Bellevue School of Nursing, the Schools of the Health Professions, the Health Professions Library and several research centers and computer labs.

The Brookdale Campus is the site of the Hunter dormitory, which is home to over 600 undergraduate and graduate students, as well as a limited number of nurses employed at Bellevue Hospital. Prior to the opening of City College's new "Towers," the Brookdale complex was the City University's only dormitory facility.

Other facilities
The institution owns and operates property outside of its main campuses, including the MFA Building at 205 Hudson, Roosevelt House, Baker Theatre Building, Silberman School of Social Work, and the Hunter College Campus Schools. The MFA Studio Art program was formerly run out of a building on West 41st Street between 9th and 10th Avenues. It was a  industrial space that students converted to studio space for the college's BFA and MFA program. The current building in Tribeca now houses the Studio Art and Integrated Media Arts MFA program, and Art History MA program. Roosevelt House, located on East 65th Street, is the historic family home of Franklin and Eleanor Roosevelt. Hunter's Roosevelt House Public Policy Institute is now located there, honoring the public policy commitments of Franklin and Eleanor Roosevelt. Baker Theatre Building located on 149 East 67th Street, New York, NY 10065 is the home of Hunter's Department of Theatre thanks to the extraordinary generosity of Hunter trustee Patty Baker ’82 and her husband, Jay. The Silberman School of Social Work is located between 118th and 119th street on 3rd Ave. The Hunter Campus Schools—Hunter College High School and Hunter College Elementary School—are publicly funded schools for the intellectually gifted. Located at East 94th Street, the Campus Schools are among the nation's oldest and largest elementary and secondary schools of their kind.

Libraries
The Leon & Toby Cooperman Library entrance is located on the third-floor walkway level of the East Building. The Cooperman Library has individual and group study rooms, special facilities for students with disabilities, networked computer classrooms and labs for word processing and internet access.

The Social Work & Urban Public Health Library, located on the main floor of the Silberman Building, (SWUPHL) serves the academic and research needs of the Silberman School of Social Work as well as Hunter’s Urban Public Health, Community Health Education, and Nutrition programs. 

The onsite, physical collection includes 55,000 books and journals as well as audio-visual materials. Silberman patrons have remote access to the Hunter Libraries electronic collections which include 250,000 full-text eBooks, 100,000 eJournals, and over 300 electronic databases.  SWUPHL is a pick-up/drop-off site for the CUNY intra-library loan system (CLICS) that facilitates the sharing of books between all the CUNY libraries.  In addition, SWUPHL participates in the national interlibrary loan program for academic libraries. These reciprocal agreements allow the patrons of SWUPHL extensive access to a multitude of collections. 

The SWUPHL Faculty provide drop-in and by-appointment reference services, research consultations, classroom and individual instruction.  The library has 6 group study rooms, group and silent study areas, desktop computers, a laptop computer loan program, photocopiers, printing stations, and a book scanner. 

The Judith and Stanley Zabar Art Library, dedicated in December 2008, was made possible through the support of Judith Zabar, a member of the Hunter College Class of 1954, and her husband Stanley Zabar.

Academics
Hunter is organized into four schools: The School of Arts and Sciences, the School of Education, the School of the Health Professions, and the School of Social Work. The institution had an undergraduate admissions acceptance rate of 36% in Fall 2018. Hunter offers 70 programs leading to a BA or BS degree; 10 BA-MA joint degree programs; and 75 graduate programs.

Students at Hunter may study within the fields of fine arts, the humanities, the language arts, the sciences, the social sciences, and the applied arts and sciences, as well as in professional areas in accounting, education, health sciences, and nursing. Regardless of area of concentration, all undergraduate Hunter students are encouraged to have broad exposure to the liberal arts; Hunter was one of the first colleges in the nation to pass a 12-credit curriculum requirement for pluralism and diversity courses.

As of 2007, Hunter had 673 full-time and 886 part-time faculty members, and 20,844 students—15,718 undergraduates and 5,126 graduates. Over 50% of Hunter's students belong to ethnic minority groups. The class of 2011 represented 60 countries and speaks 59 different languages. Seventy-one percent of these students were born outside the United States or have at least one foreign-born parent. SAT and high school GPA scores for the entering Fall 2012 class of freshmen had an SAT score 25th–75th percentile range of 1090 to 1280 and high school GPA 25th–75th percentile range of 85% to 92%.

Rankings
Hunter College rankings are as follows:

National

ARWU: 187–200

Forbes: 129

THE/WSJ: 256

QS: 151–160

CWUR: 218

Regional

U.S. News & World Report: 18

Washington Monthly: 37

Graduate Program in Fine Arts

In the most recent edition of U.S. News & World Report Ranking of Graduate Fine Arts Programs, Hunter has been ranked 23rd best in the United States. Hunter's MFA Programs in Studio Art (Painting and Sculpture) and Studio Art (Painting and Drawing) have both been ranked ninth best in the nation. In 2017, Artsy included Hunter's in the list of "Top 15 Art Schools in the United States." The admission to Hunter's MFA Programs in Studio Art is highly competitive, with the average acceptance rate of 8% as of 2018.

Honors programs
Hunter offers several honors programs, including the Macaulay Honors College and the Thomas Hunter Honors Program. The Macaulay Honors College, a CUNY-wide honors program, supports the undergraduate education of academically gifted students. University Scholars benefit from a full tuition scholarship (up to the value of in-state tuition only as of Fall 2013, effectively restricting it to NY state residents), personalized advising, early registration, access to internships, and study abroad opportunities. All scholars at Hunter are given the choice of either a free dormitory room at the Brookdale Campus for two years or a yearly stipend.

The Thomas Hunter Honors Program offers topical interdisciplinary seminars and academic concentrations designed to meet students’ individual interests. The program is open to outstanding students pursuing a BA and is orchestrated under the supervision of an Honors Council. It can be combined with, or replace, a formal departmental major/minor.

Hunter offers other honors programs, including Honors Research Training Programs and Departmental Honors opportunities, The Freshmen Honors Scholar Programs inclusive of the Athena Scholar program, Daedalus Scholar program, Muse Scholar program, Nursing Scholar program, Roosevelt Scholar program, and the Yalow Scholar program.

In addition to these honors programs, several honors societies are based at Hunter, including Phi Beta Kappa (PBK). A small percentage of Hunter students are invited to join Hunter's Nu chapter of PBK, which has existed at the college since 1920.

Student life

Student governance
The Hunter College student body is governed by the Undergraduate Student Government and the Graduate Student Association (GSA),.

Clubs
Hunter offers approximately 150 clubs. These organizations range from the academic to the athletic, and from the religious/spiritual to the visual and performing arts. There are clubs based on specific interests, such as "Russian Club", which offers a look at Russian life and culture and "InterVarsity Christian Fellowship" an organization whose vision is to "transform students and faculty, renew the campus, and develop world changers."

Fraternities and sororities
National – Social
Alpha Epsilon Pi (ΑΕΠ) – international social fraternity
Kappa Sigma (ΚΣ) – international social fraternity
Delta Sigma Theta (ΔΣΘ) – international social sorority
Phi Sigma Sigma (ΦΣΣ) – international social sorority

National – Service
Alpha Phi Omega (ΑΦΩ) – national co-educational service fraternity

Local – Social
Alpha Sigma (ΑΣ) – local social sorority
Nu Phi Delta (ΝΦΔ) – local multicultural social fraternity

Local – Service
Theta Phi Gamma (ΘΦΓ) – local cultural and philanthropic sorority
Epsilon Sigma Phi (ΕΣΦ) – local multicultural service sorority
Zeta Phi Alpha (ΖΦΑ) – local service sorority

Non-Greek
Gamma Ce Upsilon (ΓCΥ) – non-Greek Latina sorority
Rho Psi Eta (ΡΨΙ) – pre-health sorority

Student media
Hunter College has a campus radio station, WHCS, which once broadcast at 590AM but is now solely online. The Envoy is the main campus newspaper, published bi-weekly during the academic year. Its literary and art magazine The Olivetree Review offers opportunities for publishing student prose, poetry, drama, and art. Other publications include Culture Magazine (fashion and lifestyle), Hunted Hero Comics (comics and graphic stories), The Photographer's Collective (photography), Nursing Student Press (medical news and articles), Spoon University (culinary online publication), Psych News (psychology), The Wistarion (yearbook), SABOR (Spanish language and photography/now defunct), Revista De La Academia (Spanish language/now defunct), the Islamic Times (now defunct), Political Paradigm (political science/now defunct), Hakol (Jewish interest/now defunct), and Spoof (humor/now defunct).

Past publications also include The WORD (news) and Hunter Anonymous.

Athletics
Hunter is a member of the National Collegiate Athletic Association (NCAA) and competes at the Division III level.

The mascot is the Hawks. Hunter plays in the City University of New York Athletic Conference.

The basketball, volleyball and wrestling teams play at the Hunter Sportsplex.

Manhattan/Hunter College Science High School
As a partnership with the New York City Department of Education, the Manhattan/Hunter College High School for Sciences was opened in 2003 on the campus of the former Martin Luther King, Jr. High School on the Upper West Side. Unlike Hunter's campus schools, Hunter Science does not require an entrance exam for admission.

Notable alumni

Arts
This list covers alumni in visual, musical, and performing arts.

 Martina Arroyo – opera singer
 Barbara Adrian – artist
 Robert Altman – photographer
 Firelei Báez – visual artist
 Jules de Balincourt – artist (painter)
 Crackhead Barney – performance artist
 Robert Barry (born 1936) – conceptual artist
 Katherine Behar – artist (performance)
 Aisha Tandiwe Bell – artist (mixed media)
 Daniel Bozhkov – artist (painter, performance)
 Vivian E. Browne – artist (painter)
 Roy DeCarava – artist (photographer)
 Jacqueline Donachie – contemporary artist
 Cheryl Donegan – contemporary artist
 Echo Eggebrecht – contemporary artist
 Arthur Elgort — fashion photographer
 Gabriele Evertz – contemporary artist (painter)
 Omer Fast – artist (video, film)
 Denise Green – artist (painter)
 Wade Guyton – artist (painter)
 Minna Harkavy – sculptor
 Kim Hoeckele – artist
 Louise E. Jefferson – artist, graphic designer
 Jessica Kairé – installation artist
 Mel Kendrick – artist (sculptor, printmaking)
 Kathleen Kucka – artist (painter)
 Katerina Lanfranco – artist (painter, sculptor)
 Terrance Lindall – artist (surrealist)
 Nick Mangano – stage actor and director
 John Mateer – recording artist and filmmaker
 Monica McKelvey Johnson – artist (comics) and curator
 Awoiska van der Molen – photographer
 Robert Morris – artist (sculptor)
 Bess Myerson (1924–2014)- Miss America 1945
 Doug Ohlson (1936–2010) – abstract artist
 Roselle Osk — artist
 Paul Pfeiffer – artist (video)
 William Powhida – artist (painter)
 Henning Rübsam – choreographer and dancer
 Abbey Ryan – artist (painter)
 Lenny Schultz – comedian, gym teacher
 Sally Sheinman – artist
 Liz Story – artist (pianist)
 Robin Tewes – artist (painter)
 Cora Kelley Ward – artist (painter)
 Nari Ward – artist (sculptor)
 Beatrice Witkin – composer
 Esther Zweig – composer

Business

 Leon G. Cooperman – chairman and CEO, Omega Advisors
 Lewis Frankfort – chairman and CEO, Coach, Inc.
 Jeremiah J. Sheehan – chairman and CEO, Reynolds Metals, Inc.

Entertainment and sports

 Ellen Barkin – actress
 James Bethea – producer/television executive
 Inna Brayer – ballroom dance champion
 Edward Burns – actor
 Harry Connick, Jr. – actor, singer
 Govinda – actor, producer
 Bobby Darin – musician, singer, songwriter and actor
 Gemze de Lappe – dancer
 Ruby Dee (1945) – Oscar-nominated actress and civil rights activist
 Vin Diesel – American actor
 Grete Dollitz (1946) – radio presenter and guitarist
 Hugh Downs – television host
 Nikolai Fraiture – musician and bassist for the Strokes
 Wilson Jermaine Heredia – Tony Award-winning actor
 Alice Minnie Herts – founded Children's Educational Theatre in 1903
 Jake Hurwitz – web comedian and actor
 Richard Jeni – comedian
 Carlos Reginald King – executive producer
 Natasha Leggero – actress/comedian
 Leigh Lezark – member of DJ trio the Misshapes
 Quinn Marston – singer-songwriter of indie folk
 Janet MacLachlan (1955) – actress
 Deepti Naval – actress, filmmaker, writer and photographer
 Julianne Nicholson – actress on Law & Order: Criminal Intent (did not graduate)
 Rhea Perlman – actress
 Dascha Polanco – actress
 The Kid Mero –  former co-host of Viceland's Desus & Mero and former co-host of Showtime's Desus & Mero; AKA SKKRRRRT Loder, Ben Barson, Light-An-L Dutchie, Barmelo Xanthony, and the Plantain Supernova in the Sky
 Daniel Ravner – writer, speaker, cross media creator
 Judy Reyes – actress
 DJ Ricardo! – DJ/producer
 Margherita Roberti – opera singer
 Esther Rolle – actress
 Ron Rothstein – basketball coach
 Annette Sanders – jazz vocalist and studio singer
 Mirko Savone – actor and voice-over
 Jean Stapleton – actress
 Nick Valensi – musician and guitarist for the Strokes
 J. Buzz Von Ornsteiner – forensic psychologist/television personality

Government, politics, and social issues

Rabab Abdulhadi (born 1955), Palestinian-born American scholar, activist, educator, editor, and an academic director.
 Bella Abzug (1942) – Congresswoman (1971–1977), women's rights advocate, political activist
 Charles Barron – New York City Council member
 Keiko Bonk – Activist, artist, politician, and highest-ranking elected Green Party member in the United States
 Carmen Beauchamp Ciparick (1963) – Judge, first Hispanic woman named to the New York State Court of Appeals
 Helene S. Coleman (1925) – President, National Council of Jewish Women
 Robert R. Davila (1965) – President, Gallaudet University and advocate for the rights of the hearing impaired
 Martin Garbus (1955) – First Amendment attorney
 Paula Harper – art historian
 Florence Howe (1950) – Founder of women's studies and founder/publisher of the Feminist Press/CUNY
 Teresa Patterson Hughes – California State Senator
 Mary Johnson Lowe (1951) – Judge of the United States District Court for the Southern District of New York
 Roger Manno – Maryland politician
 Soia Mentschikoff (1934) – law professor who worked on the Uniform Commercial Code; first woman partner of a major law firm; first woman elected president, Association of American Law Schools
 Thomas J. Murphy, Jr. (1973) – Mayor, Pittsburgh, PA, 1994–2006
 Pauli Murray (1933) – first African-American woman named an Episcopal priest; human rights activist; lawyer and co-founder of N. O. W.
 Thomas P. Noonan, Jr. – Medal of Honor; United States Marine Corps, Vietnam
 Antonia Pantoja – Puerto Rican community leader, founder of Boricua College
 Thomas S. Popkewitz – Professor of curriculum theory, University of Wisconsin-Madison School of Education
 Jeanette Reibman (1937) – Pennsylvania State Representative and State Senator
Sandra Schnur – disability rights advocate
 Larry Seidlin – Broward County, Florida Judge, presided over Anna Nicole Smith's estate
 Donna Shalala – United States Secretary of Health and Human Services under Bill Clinton; tenth president of Hunter College (1980–1988)
 John Timoney – Chief of Police of Miami, Florida

Literature and journalism

 Mohamad Bazzi – journalist
 Maurice Berger – cultural critic
 Peter Carey – writer
 Colin Channer – writer, musician, co-founder of Calabash International Literary Festival Trust
 Joy Davidman – writer, poet
 Garance Franke-Ruta – journalist
 Martin Greif – writer, publisher, former managing editor of Time-Life Books
 Andrew Hubner – novelist
 Ada Louise Huxtable (1941) – writer, Pulitzer Prize-winning architectural critic
 Colette Inez – poet, academic, Guggenheim, Rockefeller, and two NEA Fellowships
 Phil Klay – writer Redeployment
 Bel Kaufman – teacher and author, best known for the 1965 novel Up the Down Staircase
 Audre Lorde (1959) – African-American poet, essayist, educator and activist
 Paule Marshall – author, MacArthur Fellow "genius grant," Dos Passos Prize for Literature
 Jenny B. Merrill (1871) – educator, author
Lilian Moore, author of children's books, teacher and poet
 Melissa Plaut – author
 Sylvia Field Porter – economist/journalist, former financial editor of the New York Post
 Carole Radziwill —  journalist, author, and television personality
 Helen Reilly  – mystery writer
 Sonia Sanchez – poet
 Paula Schwartz – novelist
 Augusta Huiell Seaman – writer
 Julie Shigekuni – novelist, professor at University of New Mexico
 Ned Vizzini – writer

Science and technology

 Henriette Avram – Computer programmer and systems analyst
 Patricia Bath – pioneering ophthalmologist
 Patricia Charache – Microbiologist and infectious disease specialist
 Mildred Cohn – biochemist, National Medal of Science
 Mary P. Dolciani – mathematician; influential in developing the basic modern method used for teaching algebra in the United States
 Mildred Dresselhaus – National Medal of Science; Institute Professor at MIT; Professor, physics and electrical engineering
 Gertrude Elion – Nobel Laureate, medicine; biochemist; National Medal of Science (1991); Lemelson-MIT Prize (1997); first woman, National Inventors Hall of Fame
 Charlotte Friend – virologist; member, National Academy of Sciences; discoverer, Friend Leukemia Virus and Friend erythroleukemia cells
 Erich Jarvis – Professor of neurobiology, Duke University Medical Center
Edna Kramer – American mathematician and popularizer of mathematics 
Marilyn Levy – photographic chemist at Fort Monmouth from 1953 to 1979
 J. Buzz Von Ornsteiner – forensic psychologist/television personality
 Arlie Petters – professor of physics, mathematics, and business administration, Duke University
 Mina Rees – mathematician; first female President, American Association for the Advancement of Science (1971)
 Rosalyn Yalow – Nobel Laureate, medicine; medical physicist; National Medal of Science (1988); Albert Lasker Award for Basic Medical Research (1977)

Notable faculty

 Vishwa Adluri, professor of religion and philosophy
 Meena Alexander, poet
 Marimba Ani (Dona Richards), afrocentric anthropologist, coined the term "Maafa" for African holocaust 
 Dora Askowith (1884–1958), Lithuanian-born American author and historian
 Harry Binswanger (born 1944), philosopher
 Emily Braun, Canadian-born art historian and curator
 Joyce Brothers (1927–2013), psychologist, television personality, advice columnist, and writer
 Jeannette Brown (born 1934), chemist, historian, author
 Peter Carey, Australian novelist
 Neal L. Cohen, NYC Health Commissioner
 LaWanda Cox, historian
 Kelle Cruz, astrophysicist
 Roy DeCarava, photographer
 Mary P. Dolciani, mathematician
 Emil Draitser (born 1937), author and professor of Russian
 Nathan Englander, novelist
 Philip Ewell, music theorist
 Stuart Ewen, historian and author
 Norman Finkelstein (born 1953), political scientist and author
 Helen Frankenthaler, artist
 Godfrey Gumbs, physicist
 E. Adelaide Hahn, classicist and linguist
 Winifred Hathaway, advocate for blind education
 H. Wiley Hitchcock, musicologist
 Alice von Hildebrand, Belgian-born American philosopher
 Eva Hoffman, writer
 Tina Howe, playwright
 Julia Indichova, reproductive healthcare activist and author
 Victoria Johnson, Associate Professor of Urban Policy
Francis Kilcoyne (died 1985), third President of Brooklyn College
John Kneller (1916–2009), English-American professor and fifth President of Brooklyn College
 Julia Jones-Pugliese (1909–1993), national champion fencer and fencing coach
 Bo Lawergren, physicist and musicologist
 Jan Heller Levi (born 1954), poet
 Lillian Rosanoff Lieber (1886-1986), Russian-American mathematician and author
 Audre Lorde (1934–1992), poet
 Marguerite Merington (1857–1951), author
 Robert Motherwell, artist
 Carrie Moyer, artist
 Colum McCann, Irish novelist
 Leonard Peikoff, Canadian-American, Ayn Rand's intellectual heir and founder of the Ayn Rand Institute
 Jeffrey T. Parsons, psychologist
 Jennifer Raab, 13th and current president of Hunter College 
 Mina Rees, mathematician
 Paul Ramirez Jonas, artist
 Blake Schwarzenbach, singer/guitarist of Jawbreaker and Jets to Brazil
Gary Shteyngart (born 1972), Soviet-born American writer
 Lao Genevra Simons, mathematician and math historian
 Tom Sleigh, poet
 Tony Smith, sculptor
 Leo Steinberg, Russian-born American art historian
 John Kennedy Toole, author
 Lionel Trilling (1905–1975), literary critic, short story writer, essayist, and teacher
 Edward P. Tryon, physicist
 Lydia Fowler Wadleigh, "lady superintendent" of the Normal School
 Nari Ward, artist
 Jacob Weinberg, pianist and composer 
 Dr. Ruth Westheimer (Dr. Ruth; born 1928), German-American sex therapist, talk show host, author, professor, Holocaust survivor, and former Haganah sniper.
 Blanche Colton Williams, professor of English literature and head of the English department
 Edwin Zarowin Track and Field Coach.

References
Informational notes

Citations

External links 

 
 Official athletics website

 
1870 establishments in New York (state)
Educational institutions established in 1870
Former women's universities and colleges in the United States
Universities and colleges in Manhattan
Upper East Side
Schools of education in the United States
Colleges of the City University of New York